The Lady Luck EP is the third EP by American rock band The Cab, released on June 30, 2009. It was released after the band's debut 2008 Whisper War album. The album reached the US Billboard Top Heatseekers albums chart but gained less than moderate success.

Background
The EP features vocals from Cassadee Pope, lead singer of Decaydance band Hey Monday on the track "Take My Hand". The band also covers the song, "I Want to Break Free" by Queen. "I'll Run" has been featured in their previous EP Drunk Love and debut album Whisper War. "Diamonds Are Forever (And Forever Is a Mighty Long Time)" is a B-side of Whisper War and was included on the Japan edition of the album.

Track listing
 "Take My Hand" (Remix) (featuring Cassadee Pope)
 "I AM Who I AM" (featuring Eloquent & DJ Break)
 "Diamonds Are Forever (And Forever Is a Mighty Long Time)"
 "I'll Run" (Strings Version)
 "I Want to Break Free" (Queen cover)
 "Lights" (bonus track)

References

2009 EPs
The Cab albums
Fueled by Ramen EPs